Troy Sylvanus Kinney (December 1, 1871 – January 29, 1938) was an American artist, etcher, and author. Troy Kinney was most notable for his works portraying dance performers, fanciful subjects, and classically styled nudes. He worked with dancers, including Ruth St. Denis, Anna Pavlova, and Sophie Pflanz among others. His artistic works are part of the collections of the Art Institute of Chicago, the Cleveland Museum of Art, the New York Public Library, the Library of Congress, and many others.

Early life and career
Troy Sylvanus Kinney was born the son of William and Mary Kinney in Kansas City, Missouri. He attended Yale University, graduating in 1896, and then after a brief time illustrating for newspapers in the Baltimore, Maryland area, he moved to study at the Art Institute of Chicago, where he would later become a full member of the Chicago Society of Etchers. He met and in 1900 married his wife and collaborator Margaret West Kinney (1872–1952). They were premier illustrators of the early 20th century, creating works together under the name "The Kinneys", including scores of books, and covers for Harper's Bazaar magazine.

Artistic career
Perhaps Troy Kinney's greatest legacy is in his contributions in the area of dance. He co-authored with his wife the books "Social Dancing of Today" and "The Dance: Its Place in Art and Life", for which he traveled throughout the world to study various dance styles. It remains to this day one of the most comprehensive works on the subject.

Besides being a member of the Chicago Society of Etchers, Troy Kinney was a member of the Society of American Etchers, and the National Academy of Design.

Troy Kinney died near his art studio in Falls Village, Connecticut, leaving his wife and only child, John West Kinney.

Books
Kinney, Troy and Royal Cortissoz - The Etchings of Troy Kinney 1929
Kinney, Troy and Margaret West Kinney - The Dance: Its Place in Art and Life 1914, New York, Frederick A. Stokes Company
Morgan Charles - Troy Kinney. American Etchers- Volume IX. 1930
Serge Leslie - Selected Letters of Troy Kinney to Doris Niles 1952

Sources

Online Archive of California
Social Dancing of Today free online text
Some selected works of Troy Kinney

External links

Margaret West Kinney at the Illinois Women Artists Project
 and at WorldCat

1871 births
1938 deaths
Yale University alumni
Federal Art Project artists
Artists from Kansas City, Missouri
American etchers
American illustrators
20th-century American printmakers
National Academy of Design members